Troides haliphron, the haliphron birdwing, is a birdwing butterfly confined to Sulawesi and the lesser Sunda Islands.

Description

Troides haliphron is sexually dimorphic.

Male: The forewings are ground colour black. The veins are bordered by white shading. The hindwings are ground colour black. There is a golden band in the discal area of the wing. The veins are black and they cleave the golden area. The underside is similar.

Female: The female is larger than the male. The ground colour of the female is brown. The veins are bordered by white shading. There is a yellow area with dark veins on the hindwings. There is one chain of black spots is in the yellow area. The underside is similar.

The abdomen is dark brown, and the underside has yellow spots. Head and thorax are black. The nape has a red hair coat.

Taxonomy
Troides staudingeri has at times been considered a subspecies of Troides haliphron.

Subspecies celebensis - the status of this taxon is uncertain. It has been placed within Troides criton, and Troides oblongomaculatus. It may be a hybrid with Troides helena hephaestus.

Subspecies
A number of other subspecies have been described from different islands. They are:

Troides haliphron celebensis - possibly central Celebes (see Taxonomy)
Troides haliphron haliphron - South Celebes
Troides haliphron naias - Sumba
Troides haliphron socrates - Wetar and Sumbawa (probably a local form and not a subspecies)
Troides haliphron selayarensis - Selayar Islands

Biology
The larva feeds on species Aristolochia.

Related species

Troides haliphron  is a member of the Troides haliphron species group. The members of this clade are:

Troides haliphron (Boisduval, 1836)
Troides darsius (Gray, [1853])
Troides vandepolli (Snellen, 1890)
Troides criton (C. & R. Felder, 1860)
Troides riedeli (Kirsch, 1885)
Troides plato (Wallace, 1865)
Troides staudingeri (Röber, 1888)

References

D'Abrera, B. (1975) Birdwing Butterflies of the World. Country Life Books, London.
Haugum, J. & Low, A.M. 1978-1985. A Monograph of the Birdwing Butterflies. 2 volumes. Scandinavian Press, Klampenborg; 663 pp.
Kurt Rumbucher and Oliver Schäffler, 2004 Part 19, Papilionidae X. Troides III. in Erich Bauer and Thomas Frankenbach Eds. Butterflies of the World. Keltern: Goecke & Evers

External links

Troides haliphron at Ngypal
Butterflycorner.net Images from Naturhistorisches Museum Wien (English/German)
Sulawesi Lowland Rain Forests Ecoregion

Haliphron
Butterflies of Indonesia
Endemic fauna of Indonesia
Butterflies described in 1836